Below is a list of current New Zealand NBL team rosters:

Current team roster

Auckland Tuatara

Canterbury Rams

Franklin Bulls

Hawke's Bay Hawks

Manawatu Jets

Nelson Giants

Otago Nuggets

Southland Sharks

Taranaki Airs

Wellington Saints

See also
List of current NBL team rosters

rosters